Pauline Ng Chow May-lin JP (born 1947, in Hong Kong) is a former member of the Legislative Council of Hong Kong.

After graduating from the University of London, she worked as a teacher in the Kit Sam Middle School. She ran for the first District Board election in 1982 in a Wang Tau Hom constituency for the Wong Tai Sin District Board. She continued to serve until 1991. She was subsequently appointed by Governor Edward Youde to the Legislative Council in 1983 and served until 1988.

References

1947 births
Living people
Hong Kong educators
Alumni of the University of London
Alumni of the University of Edinburgh
HK LegCo Members 1985–1988
District councillors of Wong Tai Sin District